Indo-Scythians (also called Indo-Sakas) were a group of nomadic Iranian peoples of Scythian origin who migrated from Central Asia southward into modern day Afghanistan, Pakistan and Northwestern India from the middle of the 2nd century BCE to the 4th century CE.

The first Saka king of India was Maues/Moga (1st century BCE) who established Saka power in Gandhara, Afghanistan, Pakistan, India and the Indus Valley. The Indo-Scythians extended their supremacy over north-western India, conquering the Indo-Greeks and other local kingdoms. The Indo-Scythians were apparently subjugated by the Kushan Empire, by either Kujula Kadphises or Kanishka. Yet the Saka continued to govern as satrapies, forming the Northern Satraps and Western Satraps. The power of the Saka rulers started to decline in the 2nd century CE after the Indo-Scythians were defeated by the Satavahana emperor Gautamiputra Satakarni. Indo-Scythian rule in the northwestern Indian subcontinent ceased when the last Western Satrap Rudrasimha III was defeated by the Gupta emperor Chandragupta II in 395 CE.

The invasion of northern regions of the Indian subcontinent by Scythian tribes from Central Asia, often referred to as the Indo-Scythian invasion, played a significant part in the history of the Indian subcontinent as well as of nearby countries. In fact, the Indo-Scythian war is just one chapter in the events triggered by the nomadic flight of Central Asians from conflict with tribes such as the Xiongnu in the 2nd century CE, which had lasting effects on Bactria, Kabul, and the Indian subcontinent as well as far-off Rome in the west, and more nearby to the west in Parthia.

Ancient Roman historians, including Arrian and Claudius Ptolemy, have mentioned that the ancient Sakas ("Sakai") were nomadic people.

The first rulers of the Indo-Scythian Kingdom were Maues, c. 85–60 BCE, and Vonones, c. 75–65 BCE.

Origins 

The ancestors of the Indo-Scythians are thought to have been Sakas (Scythian) tribes. 
"One group of Indo-European speakers that makes an early appearance on the Xinjiang stage is the Saka (Ch. Sai). Saka is more a generic term than a name for a specific state or ethnic group; Saka tribes were part of a cultural continuum of early nomads across Siberia and the Central Eurasian steppe lands from Xinjiang to the Black Sea. Like the Scythians whom Herodotus describes in book four of his History (Saka is an Iranian word equivalent to the Greek Scythes, and many scholars refer to them together as Saka-Scythian), Sakas were Iranian-speaking horse nomads who deployed chariots in battle, sacrificed horses, and buried their dead in barrows or mound tombs called kurgans."

The Sakas of Western India spoke the Saka language, also known as Khotanese as it was first attested in the Tarim Basin.

Achaemenid period (6th-4th century BCE)
During the Achaemenid conquest of the Indus Valley circa 515 BCE, the Achaemenid army was not uniquely Persian, and the Sakas probably participated in the invasion of northwestern India. The Achaemenid army was composed of many different ethnicities that were part of the vast Achaemenid Empire. The army included Bactrians, Sakas (Scythians), Parthians, and Sogdians. Herodotus gives a full list of the ethnicities of the Achaemenid army, in which are included Sakas together with Ionians (Greeks), and even Ethiopians. These ethnicities are likely to have been included in the Achaemenid army which invaded India.

Some scholars, including Michael Witzel and Christopher I. Beckwith suggested that the Shakyas, the clan of the historical Gautama Buddha, were originally Scythians from Central Asia, and that the Indian ethnonym Śākya has the same origin as “Scythian”, called Sakas in India. This would also explain the strong support of the Sakas for the Buddhist faith in India.

The Persians, the Sakas and the Greeks, may have later participated in the campaigns of Chandragupta Maurya to gain the throne of Magadha circa 320 BCE. The Mudrarakshasa states that after Alexander's death, an alliance of "Shaka-Yavana-Kamboja-Parasika-Bahlika" was used by Chandragupta Maurya in his campaign to take the throne in Magadha and found the Mauryan Empire. The Sakas were the Scythians, the Yavanas were the Greeks, and the Parasikas were the Persians.

Yuezhi expansion (2nd century BCE)
In the 2nd century BCE, a fresh nomadic movement started among the Central Asian tribes, producing lasting effects on the history of Rome in Europe, Parthia in Western Asia, and Bactria, Kabul, and India in the east in Southern Asia. Recorded in the annals of the Han dynasty and other Chinese records, this great tribal movement began after the Yuezhi tribe was defeated by the Xiongnu, fleeing westwards after their defeat and creating a domino effect as they displaced other central Asian tribes in their path.

According to these ancient sources Modu Shanyu of the Xiongnu tribe of Mongolia attacked the Yuezhi (possibly related to the Tocharians who lived in eastern Tarim Basin area) and evicted them from their homeland between the Qilian Shan and Dunhuang around 175 BCE. Leaving behind a remnant of their number, most of the population moved westwards into the Ili River area. There, they displaced the Sakas, who migrated south into Ferghana and Sogdiana. According to the Chinese historical chronicles (who call the Sakas, "Sai" 塞): "[The Yuezhi] attacked the king of the Sai, who moved a considerable distance to the south and the Yuezhi then occupied his lands."

Sometime after 155 BCE, the Yuezhi were again defeated by an alliance of the Wusun and the Xiongnu, and were forced to move south, again displacing the Scythians, who migrated south towards Bactria and present Afghanistan, and south-west closer towards Parthia.

The Sakas seem to have entered the territory of the Greco-Bactrian Kingdom around 145 BCE, where they burnt to the ground the Greek city of Alexandria on the Oxus. The Yuezhi remained in Sogdiana on the northern bank of the Oxus, but they became suzerains of the Sakas in Bactrian territory, as described by the Chinese ambassador Zhang Qian who visited the region around 126 BCE.

In Parthia, between 138–124 BCE, a tribe known to ancient Greek scholars as the Sacaraucae (probably from the Old Persian Sakaravaka "nomadic Saka") and an allied people, the Massagetae, came into conflict with the Parthian Empire. The Sacaraucae-Massagetae alliance won several battles and killed, in succession, the Parthian kings Phraates II and Artabanus I.

The Parthian king Mithridates II finally retook control of parts of Central Asia, first by defeating the Yuezhi in Sogdia in 115 BCE, and then defeating the Scythians in Parthia and Seistan around 100 BCE.

After their defeat, the Yuezhi tribes migrated relatively far to the east into Bactria, which they were to control for several centuries, and from which they later conquered northern India to found the Kushan Empire.

Settlement in Sakastan 

The Sakas settled in Drangiana, an area of southern Afghanistan, western Pakistan and south Iran, which was then named after them, as Sakastan or Sistan. From there, they progressively expanded into present day Iran as well as northern India, where they established various kingdoms, and where they were known as "Saka".

The mixed Scythian hordes that migrated to Drangiana and surrounding regions later spread further into north and south-west India via the lower Indus valley. Their migration spread into Sovira, Gujarat, Rajasthan and northern India, including kingdoms in the Indian mainland.

The Arsacid emperor Mithridates II (c. 123–88/87 BCE) pursued an aggressive military policy in Central Asia and added many provinces to the Parthian Empire. This included Western Bactria which Mithridates wrested from the Indo-Scythians.  

Following military pressure from the Yuezhi (precursors of the Kushana), a section of the Indo-Scythians moved from Bactria to Lake Helmond (or Hāmūn), and settled in or around Drangiana (Sigal), a region which later came to be called "Sakistana of the Skythian Sakai ", towards the end of 1st century BCE. The region is still known as Seistan.

The presence of the Sakas in Sakastan in the 1st century BCE is mentioned by Isidore of Charax in his "Parthian stations". He explained that they were bordered at that time by Greek cities to the east (Alexandria of the Caucasus and Alexandria of the Arachosians), and the Parthian-controlled territory of Arachosia to the south:

"Beyond is Sacastana of the Scythian Sacae, which is also Paraetacena, 63 schoeni. There are the city of Barda and the city of Min and the city of Palacenti and the city of Sigal; in that place is the royal residence of the Sacae; and nearby is the city of Alexandria (Alexandria Arachosia), and six villages." Parthian stations, 18.

Indo-Scythian kingdoms

Pamirs to Taxila 

Ahmad Hassan Dani and professor , from the petroglyphs left by Saka soldiers at principal river crossings at Chilas and the Sacred Rock of Hunza in Pakistan, have established the route across the Karakoram mountains used by Maues, the first Indo-Scythian king, to capture Taxila from Indo-Greek King Apollodotus II.

The 1st century CE Periplus of the Erythraean Sea describes the Scythian territories there:

"Beyond this region (Gedrosia), the continent making a wide curve from the east across the depths of the bays, there follows the coast district of Scythia, which lies above toward the north; the whole marshy; from which flows down the river Sinthus, the greatest of all the rivers that flow into the Erythraean Sea, bringing down an enormous volume of water (...) This river has seven mouths, very shallow and marshy, so that they are not navigable, except the one in the middle; at which by the shore, is the market-town, Barbaricum. Before it there lies a small island, and inland behind it is the metropolis of Scythia, Minnagara; it is subject to Parthian princes who are constantly driving each other out.."

The Indo-Scythians ultimately established a kingdom in the northwest, based near Taxila, with two great Satraps, one in Mathura in the east, and one in Surastrene (Gujarat) in the southwest.

In the southeast, the Indo-Scythians invaded the area of Ujjain, but were subsequently repelled in 57 BCE by the Malwa king Vikramaditya. To commemorate the event Vikramaditya established the Vikrama era, a specific Indian calendar starting in 57 BCE. More than a century later, in CE 78, the Sakas would again invade Ujjain and establish the Saka era, marking the beginning of the long-lived Saka Western Satraps kingdom.

Gandhara and Punjab 

The presence of the Scythians in modern day Pakistan and north-western India during the 1st century BCE was contemporary with that of the Indo-Greek Kingdoms there, and it seems they initially recognized the power of the local Greek rulers.

Maues first conquered Gandhara and Taxila in present day Afghanistan and Pakistan around 80 BCE, but his kingdom disintegrated after his death. In the east, the Indian king Vikrama retook Ujjain from the Indo-Scythians, celebrating his victory by the creation of the Vikrama era (starting 58 BCE). Indo-Greek kings again ruled after Maues, and prospered, as indicated by the profusion of coins from Kings Apollodotus II and Hippostratos. Not until Azes I, in 55 BCE, did the Indo-Scythians take final control of northwestern India, with their victory over Hippostratos.

Sculpture 

Excavations organized by John Marshall found several stone sculptures in the Early Saka layer (Layer No4, corresponding to the period of Azes I, in which numerous coins of the latter were found).

Several of them are toilet trays (also called stone palettes) roughly imitative of earlier, and finer, Hellenistic examples found in the earlier layers. Marshall comments that "we have a praiseworthy effort to copy a Hellenistic original but obviously without the appreciation of form and skill which were necessary for the task". From the same layer, several statuettes in the round are also known, in very rigid and frontal style.

Bimaran casket 

Azes is connected to the Bimaran casket, one of the earliest representations of the Buddha. The casket was used for the dedication of a stupa in Bamiran, near Jalalabad in Afghanistan, and placed inside the stupa with several coins of Azes. This event may have happened during the reign of Azes (60–20 BCE), or slightly later. The Indo-Scythians are otherwise connected with Buddhism (see Mathura lion capital), and it is indeed possible they would have commended the work.

Mathura area ("Northern Satraps") 

 

In northern India, the Indo-Scythians conquered the area of Mathura over Indian kings around 60 BCE. Some of their satraps were Hagamasha and Hagana, who were in turn followed by the Saca Great Satrap Rajuvula.

The Mathura lion capital, an Indo-Scythian sandstone capital in crude style, from Mathura in northern India, and dated to the 1st century CE, describes in kharoshthi the gift of a stupa with a relic of the Buddha, by Queen Nadasi Kasa, the wife of the Indo-Scythian ruler of Mathura, Rajuvula. The capital also mentions the genealogy of several Indo-Scythian satraps of Mathura.

Rajuvula apparently eliminated the last of the Indo-Greek kings Strato II around 10 CE, and took his capital city, Sagala.

The coinage of the period, such as that of Rajuvula, tends to become very crude and barbarized in style. It is also very much debased, the silver content becoming lower and lower, in exchange for a higher proportion of bronze, an alloying technique (billon) suggesting less than wealthy finances.

The Mathura lion capital inscriptions attest that Mathura fell under the control of the Sakas. The inscriptions contain references to Kharahostes and Queen Ayasia, the "chief queen of the Indo-Scythian ruler of Mathura, satrap Rajuvula."  Kharahostes was the son of Arta as is attested by his own coins. Arta is stated to be brother of King Moga or Maues.

The Indo-Scythian satraps of Mathura are sometimes called the "Northern Satraps", in opposition to the "Western Satraps" ruling in Gujarat and Malwa. After Rajuvula, several successors are known to have ruled as vassals to the Kushans, such as the "Great Satrap" Kharapallana and the "Satrap" Vanaspara, who are known from an inscription discovered in Sarnath, and dated to the 3rd year of Kanishka (c. CE 130), in which they were paying allegiance to the Kushans.

Pataliputra 

The text of the Yuga Purana describes an invasion of Pataliputra by the Scythians sometime during the 1st century BCE, after seven great kings had ruled in succession in Saketa following the retreat of the Yavanas. The Yuga Purana explains that the king of the Sakas killed one fourth of the population, before he was himself slain by the Kalinga king Shata and a group of Sabalas (Sabaras or Bhillas).

Kushan and Indo-Parthian conquests 
After the death of Azes, the rule of the Indo-Scythians in northwestern India was shattered with the rise of the Indo-Parthian ruler Gondophares in the last years of the 1st century BCE. For the following decades, a number of minor Scythian leaders maintained themselves in local strongholds on the fringes of the loosely assembled Indo-Parthian empire, some of them paying formal allegiance to Gondophares I and his successors.

During the latter part of the 1st century CE, the Indo-Parthian overlordship was gradually replaced with that of the Kushans, one of the five tribes of the Yuezhi who had lived in Bactria for more than a century, and were now expanding into India to create a Kushan Empire. The Kushans ultimately regained northwestern India from around CE 75, and the area of Mathura from around CE 100, where they were to prosper for several centuries.

Western Kshatrapas 

Indo-Scythians continued to hold the area of Seistan until the reign of Bahram II (CE 276–293), and held several areas of India well into the 1st millennium: Kathiawar and Gujarat were under their rule until the 5th century under the designation of Western Kshatrapas. The Khsatrap Rudradaman I was a notable conqueror whose exploits are inscribed in the Junagadh rock inscription of Rudradaman. During his campaigns, Rudradaman conqured the Yaudheyas and defeated the Satavahana Empire. The Western Kshatraps were eventually conquered by the Gupta emperor Chandragupta II (also called Vikramaditya).

Indo-Scythian coinage 

Indo-Scythian coinage is generally of a high artistic quality, although it clearly deteriorates towards the disintegration of Indo-Scythian rule around CE 20 (coins of Rajuvula). A fairly high-quality but rather stereotypical coinage would continue in the Western Satraps until the 4th century.

Indo-Scythian coinage is generally quite realistic, artistically somewhere between Indo-Greek and Kushan coinage. It is often suggested Indo-Scythian coinage benefited from the help of Greek celators (Boppearachchi).

Indo-Scythian coins essentially continue the Indo-Greek tradition, by using the Greek language on the obverse and the Kharoshthi language on the reverse. The portrait of the king is never shown however, and is replaced by depictions of the king on horse (and sometimes on camel), or sometimes sitting cross-legged on a cushion. The reverse of their coins typically show Greek divinities.

Buddhist symbolism is present throughout Indo-Scythian coinage. In particular, they adopted the Indo-Greek practice since Menander I of showing divinities forming the vitarka mudra with their right hand (as for the mudra-forming Zeus on the coins of Maues or Azes II), or the presence of the Buddhist lion on the coins of the same two kings, or the triratana symbol on the coins of Zeionises.

Indo-Scythian art 

Besides coinage, few works of art are known to indisputably represent Indo-Scythians. Indo-Scythian rulers are usually depicted on horseback in armour, but the coins of Azilises show the king in a simple, undecorated, tunic.

Several Gandharan sculptures also show foreigners in soft tunics, sometimes wearing the pointed hat typical of Scythians. They stand in contrast to representations of Kushan men, who seem to wear thick, rigid, tunics, and who are generally represented in a much more simplistic manner.

Buner reliefs 

Indo-Scythian soldiers in military attire are sometimes represented in Buddhist friezes in the art of Gandhara (particularly in the Buner reliefs). They are depicted in ample tunics with trousers, and have heavy straight swords as weapons. They wear pointed hoods or the Scythian cap (see Pointed hat), which distinguishes them from the Indo-Parthians who only wore a simple fillet over their bushy hair, and which is also systematically worn by Indo-Scythian rulers on their coins. With the right hand, some of them are forming the Karana mudra against evil spirits. In Gandhara, such friezes were used as decorations on the pedestals of Buddhist stupas. They are contemporary with other friezes representing people in purely Greek attire, hinting at an intermixing of Indo-Scythians (holding military power) and Indo-Greeks (confined, under Indo-Scythian rule, to civilian life).

Another relief is known where the same type of soldiers are playing musical instruments and dancing, activities which are widely represented elsewhere in Gandharan art: Indo-Scythians are typically shown as reveling devotees.

Stone palettes 

Numerous stone palettes found in Gandhara are considered good representatives of Indo-Scythian art. These palettes combine Greek and Iranian influences, and are often realized in a simple, archaic style. Stone palettes have only been found in archaeological layers corresponding to Indo-Greek, Indo-Scythian and Indo-Parthian rule, and are essentially unknown in the preceding Mauryan layers or the succeeding Kushan layers.

Very often these palettes represent people in Greek dress in mythological scenes, a few in Parthian dress (head-bands over bushy hair, crossed-over jacket on a bare chest, jewelry, belt, baggy trousers), and even fewer in Indo-Scythian dress (Phrygian hat, tunic and comparatively straight trousers). A palette found in Sirkap and now in the New Delhi Museum shows a winged Indo-Scythian horseman riding winged deer, and being attacked by a lion.

The Indo-Scythians and Buddhism 
The Indo-Scythians seem to have been followers of Buddhism, and many of their practices apparently continued those of the Indo-Greeks.

Royal dedications

Several Indo-Scythian kings after Azes are known for making Buddhist dedications in their name, on plaques or reliquaries: 
 Patika Kusulaka (25 BCE – 10 CE) related his donation of a relic of the Buddha Shakyamuni to a Buddhist monastery, in the Taxila copper plate. 
 Kharahostes (10 BCE – 10 CE) is mentioned on the Buddhist Mathura lion capital and on a reliquary. His coins were also found in the Bimaran casket, a beautiful Buddhist gold reliquary with an early image of the Buddha, now in the British Museum. Some of his coins bear the Buddhist triratna symbol.
 Vijayamitra (ruled 12 BCE - 15 CE) personally dedicated in his name a Buddhist reliquary. Some of his coins bear the Buddhist triratna symbol.
Indravarman, while still a Prince, personally dedicated in 5-6 CE a Buddhist reliquary, the Bajaur casket, now in the Metropolitan Museum of Art. 
Zeionises and Aspavarma also used the Buddhist triratna symbol on their coins. 
Rajuvula erected the Mathura lion capital, which incorporates Buddhist symbols and relates the donations by his wife of relics to a stupa.

Butkara Stupa 

Excavations at the Butkara Stupa in Swat by an Italian archaeological team have yielded various Buddhist sculptures thought to belong to the Indo-Scythian period. In particular, an Indo-Corinthian capital representing a Buddhist devotee within foliage has been found which had a reliquary and coins of Azes buried at its base, securely dating the sculpture to around 20 BCE. A contemporary pilaster with the image of a Buddhist devotee in Greek dress has also been found at the same spot, again suggesting a mingling of the two populations. Various reliefs at the same location show Indo-Scythians with their characteristic tunics and pointed hoods within a Buddhist context, and side-by-side with reliefs of standing Buddhas.

Gandharan sculptures 
Other reliefs have been found, which show Indo-Scythian men with their characteristic pointed cap pushing a cart on which is reclining the Greek god Dionysos with his consort Ariadne.

Mathura lion capital 
The Mathura lion capital, which associates many of the Indo-Scythian rulers from Maues to Rajuvula, mentions a dedication of a relic of the Buddha in a stupa. It also bears centrally the Buddhist symbol of the triratana, and is also filled with mentions of the bhagavat Buddha Sakyamuni, and characteristically Buddhist phrases such as:

"sarvabudhana puya dhamasa puya saghasa puya"
"Revere all the Buddhas, revere the dharma, revere the sangha"
(Mathura lion capital, inscription O1/O2)

Indo-Scythians in Indian literature 

The Indo-Scythians were named "Shaka" in India, an extension on the name Saka used by the Persians to designate Scythians. They are described as part of an group of other war-like tribes from the northwest.

There are important references to the warring Mleccha hordes of the Sakas, Yavanas, Kambojas and Pahlavas in the Balakanda of the Valmiki Ramayana. H. C. Raychadhury glimpsed in these verses the struggles between the Hindus and the invading hordes of Mlechcha barbarians from the northwest. The time frame for these struggles is the 2nd century BCE onwards. Raychadhury fixes the date of the present version of the Valmiki Ramayana around or after the 2nd century CE.

Mahabharata too furnishes a veiled hint about the invasion of the mixed hordes from the northwest. Vanaparava by Mahabharata contains verses in the form of prophecy deploring that "......the Mlechha (barbaric) kings of the Shakas, Yavanas, Kambojas, Bahlikas, etc. shall rule the earth un-righteously in Kali Yuga..."

As with many traditional epics, the two Indian epics Ramayana and Mahabharata, which comprise the Itihasa, have gone through multiple interpolations and redactions since its conception, rendering it impossible to accurately date. It is highly likely that these additions were made with changing political factors and the introduction of new people into society.

Indo-Scythians in Greco-Roman Sources 
 

The country of Scythia in the area of now Pakistan, and especially around the mouth of the Indus with its capital at Minnagara (modern day Karachi) is mentioned extensively in Western maps and travel descriptions of the period. The Ptolemy world map and Periplus of the Erythraean Sea mention prominently the country of Scythia in the Indus Valley, as well as Roman Tabula Peutingeriana. The Periplus states that Minnagara was the capital of Scythia, and that Parthian princes from within it were fighting for its control during the 1st century CE. It also distinguishes Scythia from Ariaca further east, (centred in Gujarat and Malwa), over which ruled the Western Satrap king Nahapana.

Sai-Wang Scythian hordes of Chipin or Kipin 

A section of the Central Asian Scythians (under Sai-Wang) is said to have taken a southerly direction and after passing through the Pamirs entered the Chipin or Kipin after crossing the Xuandu (懸度 Hanging Pass) located above the valley of Kanda in Swat country. Chipin has been identified by Pelliot, Bagchi, Raychaudhury and some others with Kashmir while other scholars identify it with Kapisha (Kafirstan). The Sai-Wang had established his kingdom in Kipin. S. Konow interprets the Sai-Wang as Śaka Murunda of Indian literature, Murunda being equal to Wang i.e. king, master or lord, but Bagchi who takes the word Wang in the sense of the king of the Scythians but he distinguishes the Sai Sakas from the Murunda Sakas. There are reasons to believe that Sai Scythians were Kamboja Scythians and therefore Sai-Wang belonged to the Scythianised Kambojas (i.e. Parama-Kambojas) of the Transoxiana region and came back to settle among his own stock after being evicted from his ancestral land located in Scythia or Shakadvipa. King Moga or Maues could have belonged to this group of Scythians who had migrated from the Sai country (Central Asia) to Chipin.

Evidence about joint invasions 

The Scythian groups that invaded India and set up various kingdoms included, besides the Sakas, other allied tribes, such as the Medii, Xanthii, and Massagetae. These peoples were all absorbed into the community of Kshatriyas of mainstream Indian society.

The Shakas were formerly a people of the trans-Hemodos region—the Shakadvipa of the Puranas or the Scythia of the classical writings. Isidore of Charax (beginning of 1st century CE) attests them in Sakastana (modern Seistan). The Periplus of the Erythraean Sea (c. CE 70–80) also attests a Scythian district in lower Indus with Minnagra as its capital. Ptolemy (c. CE 140) also attests to an Indo-Scythia in south-western India which comprised the Patalene and Surastrene (Saurashtra) territories.

The 2nd century BCE Scythian invasion of India, was in all probability carried out jointly by the Sakas, Pahlavas, Kambojas, Paradas, Rishikas and other allied tribes from the northwest.

Main Indo-Scythian tribes and rulers

Khyber-Pakhtunkhwa, Eastern Afghanistan, Eastern Pakistan, and Kashmir 
 Maues, c. 85–60 BCE
 Vonones, c. 75–65 BCE
 Spalahores, c. 75–65 BCE, satrap and brother of King Vonones, and probably the later King Spalirises.
 Spalagadames, c. 60–57 BCE,satrap, and son of Spalahores..
 Spalirises c. 50 BCE, king and brother of King Vonones.
 Azes I was also descended from Maues, c. 48/47 – 25 BCE
 Azilises, c. 60–20 BCE
 Zeionises, c. 10 BCE – CE 10
 Kharahostes, c. 10 BCE – CE 10
 Hajatria

Kshaharatas (Punjab, Pakistan and beyond) 

 Liaka Kusuluka, satrap of Chuksa
 Kusulaka Patika, satrap of Chuksa and son of Liaka Kusulaka
 Bhumaka
 Nahapana (founder of the Western Satraps)

Aprācas (Bajaur, Khyber-Pakhtunkhwa, Afghanistan, Pakistan) 

 Vijayamitra (12 BCE - CE 15), wife Rukhana
 Indravasu (c. CE 20), wife Vasumitra
 Vispavarman, wife Śiśirena
 Indravarman, wife Uttara
 Aspa (CE 15–45)  or Aspavarma (CE 15 - 45)
 Sasan

Pāratas (Balochistan, Pakistan) 

 , son of Bagareva (c. 125–150)
 , son of Yolamira (c. 150)
 Arjuna, a second son of Yolamira (c. 150–160)
 , a third son of Yolamira (c. 160–175)
 , son of Hvaramira (c. 175–185)
 Miratakhma, another son of Hvaramira (c. 185–200)
 Kozana, son of Bagavharna (and perhaps grandson of Bagamira?) (c. 200–220)
 Bhimarjuna, son of Yolatakhma (and perhaps grandson of Arjuna?) (c. 220–235)
 Koziya, son of Kozana (c. 235–265)
 Datarvharna, son of Datayola I (possible grandson of Bhimarjuna) (c. 265–280)
 Datayola II, son of Datarvharna (c. 280–300)

"Northern Satraps" (Mathura area) 

 Hagamasha (satrap, 1st century BCE)
 Hagana (satrap, 1st century BCE)
 Rajuvula, c. CE 10 (Great Satrap)
 Sodasa, son of Rajuvula
 "Great Satrap" Kharapallana (c. CE 130)
 "Satrap" Vanaspara (c. CE 130)

Minor local rulers 
 Bhadayasa
 Mamvadi
 Arsakes (Indo-Scythian)

Western Satraps 

 Nahapana (119–124)
 Chastana (c. 120), son of Ghsamotika

 Jayadaman, son of Chastana
 Rudradaman I (c. 130–150), son of Jayadaman 
 Damajadasri I (170–175)
 Jivadaman (175 died 199)
 Rudrasimha I (175–188 died 197)
 Isvaradatta (188–191)
 Rudrasimha I (restored) (191–197)
 Jivadaman (restored) (197–199)
 Rudrasena I (200–222) 
 Samghadaman (222–223)
 Damasena (223–232)
 Damajadasri II (232–239) with
 Viradaman (234–238)
 Yasodaman I (239)
 Vijayasena (239–250)
 Damajadasri III (251–255)
 Rudrasena II (255–277)
 Visvasimha (277–282)
 Bhratadarman (282–295)  with
 Visvasena (293–304)
 Rudrasimha II, son of Lord (Svami) Jivadaman (304–348) with
 Yasodaman II (317–332)
 Rudradaman II (332–348)
 Rudrasena III (348–380)
 Simhasena (Indo-Scythian ruler) (380– ?)
 Rudrasena IV (382–388)
 Rudrasimha III (388–395)

Descendants of the Indo-Scythians 

Tadeusz Sulimirski notes that the Sacae also invaded parts of northern India. Weer Rajendra Rishi, an Indian linguist has identified linguistic affinities between Indian and Central Asian languages, which further lends credence to the possibility of historical Sacae influence in northern India.

See also 

Ancient India and Central Asia
Tillya Tepe
Han–Xiongnu War

Notes

References

 Bailey, H. W. 1958. "Languages of the Saka." Handbuch der Orientalistik, I. Abt., 4. Bd., I. Absch., Leiden-Köln. 1958.
Faccenna D., "Sculptures from the sacred area of Butkara I", Istituto Poligrafico Dello Stato, Libreria Dello Stato, Rome, 1964.
 Harmatta, János, ed., 1994. History of civilizations of Central Asia, Volume II. The development of sedentary and nomadic civilizations: 700 B.C. to A.D. 250. Paris, UNESCO Publishing.
 Hill, John E. 2004. The Peoples of the West from the Weilue 魏略 by Yu Huan 魚豢: A Third Century Chinese Account Composed between AD 239 and 265. Draft annotated English translation. 
Hill, John E. (2009) Through the Jade Gate to Rome: A Study of the Silk Routes during the Later Han Dynasty, 1st to 2nd Centuries AD. BookSurge, Charleston, South Carolina. .
Hulsewé, A. F. P. and Loewe, M. A. N. 1979. China in Central Asia: The Early Stage 125 BC – AD 23: an annotated translation of chapters 61 and 96 of the History of the Former Han Dynasty. E. J. Brill, Leiden.
 Huet, Gerard (2010) "Heritage du Sanskrit Dictionnaire, Sanskrit-Francais," p. 128.  
 Litvinsky, B. A., ed., 1996. History of civilizations of Central Asia, Volume III. The crossroads of civilizations: A.D. 250 to 750. Paris, UNESCO Publishing.
 Liu, Xinru 2001 "Migration and Settlement of the Yuezhi-Kushan: Interaction and Interdependence of Nomadic and Sedentary Societies." Journal of World History, Volume 12, No. 2, Fall 2001. University of Hawaii Press, pp 261–292. .
 Bulletin of the Asia Institute: The Archaeology and Art of Central Asia. Studies From the Former Soviet Union. New Series. Edited by B. A. Litvinskii and Carol Altman Bromberg. Translation directed by Mary Fleming Zirin. Vol. 8, (1994), pp 37–46.
 Millward, James A. (2007). Eurasian Crossroads: A History of Xinjiang. Columbia University Press, New York. .
 Pulleyblank, Edwin G. 1970. "The Wu-sun and Sakas and the Yüeh-chih Migration." Bulletin of the School of Oriental and African Studies 33 (1970), pp 154–160.
 Ptolemy (1932). The Geography. Translated and edited by Edward Luther Stevenson. 1991 unabridged reproduction. Dover Publications, Mineola, N. Y.  (pbk)
 Puri, B. N. 1994. "The Sakas and Indo-Parthians." In: History of civilizations of Central Asia, Volume II. The development of sedentary and nomadic civilizations: 700 B.C. to A.D. 250. Harmatta, János, ed., 1994. Paris: UNESCO Publishing, pp 191–207.
 Ronca, Italo (1971). Ptolemaios Geographie 6,9–21. Ostrian und Zentralasien, Teil I. IsMEO — ROM.
 Watson, Burton. Trans. 1993. Records of the Grand Historian of China: Han Dynasty II (Revised Edition). Translated from the Shih chi of Ssu-ma Ch'ien. Chapter 123: The Account of Ta-yüan. Columbia University Press. 
Wilcox, Peter and Angus McBride (1986). Rome's Enemies (3): Parthians and Sassanid Persians (Men-at-Arms). Osprey Publishing; illustrated edition. .
 Yu, Taishan. 1998. A Study of Saka History. Sino-Platonic Papers No. 80. July 1998. Dept. of Asian and Middle Eastern Studies, University of Pennsylvania.
 Yu, Taishan. 2000. A Hypothesis about the Source of the Sai Tribes. Sino-Platonic Papers No. 106. September 2000. Dept. of Asian and Middle Eastern Studies, University of Pennsylvania.
 Political History of Ancient India, 1996, H. C. Raychaudhury
 Hindu Polity, A Constitutional history of India in Hindu Times, 1978, K. P. Jayswal
 Geographical Data in Early Puranas, 1972, M. R. Singh
 India and Central Asia, 1955, P. C. Bagchi.
 Geography of Puranas, 1973, S. M. Ali
 Greeks in Bactria and India, W. W. Tarn
 Early History of North India, S. Chattopadhyava
 Sakas in Ancient India, S. Chattopadhyava
 Development of Kharoshthi script, C. C. Dasgupta
 Ancient India, 1956, R. K. Mukerjee
 Ancient India, Vol III, T. L. Shah
 Hellenism in Ancient India, G. N. Banerjee
 Manu and Yajnavalkya, K. P. Jayswal
 Anabaseeos Alexanddrou, Arrian
 Mathura lion capital inscriptions
 Corpus Inscriptionium Indicarum, Vol II, Part I, S. Konow

External links 

 "Indo-Scythian dynasties", R. C. Senior
 Coins of the Indo-Scythians

 
Historical Iranian peoples
Iranian nomads
Ancient history of Pakistan
Ancient history of Afghanistan
Foreign relations of ancient India
Ancient peoples of Pakistan
Iron Age peoples of Asia
Former countries in South Asia
200s BC establishments
States and territories established in the 2nd century BC
States and territories disestablished in the 5th century
400 disestablishments